The Chaetognatha  or chaetognaths  (meaning bristle-jaws) are a phylum of predatory marine worms that are a major component of plankton worldwide. Commonly known as arrow worms, about 20% of the known Chaetognatha species are benthic, and can attach to algae and rocks. They are found in all marine waters, from surface tropical waters and shallow tide pools to the deep sea and polar regions. Most chaetognaths are transparent and are torpedo shaped, but some deep-sea species are orange.

There are more than 120 modern species assigned to over 20 genera. Despite the limited diversity of species, the number of individuals is large.

Arrow worms are usually considered a type of protostome that do not belong to either Ecdysozoa or Lophotrochozoa.

Anatomy

Chaetognaths are transparent or translucent dart-shaped animals covered by a cuticle. The body is divided into a distinct head, trunk, and tail. There are between four and fourteen hooked, grasping spines on each side of their head, flanking a hollow vestibule containing the mouth. The spines are used in hunting, and covered with a flexible hood arising from the neck region when the animal is swimming. All chaetognaths are carnivorous, preying on other planktonic animals. Some species are also reported to be omnivores, feeding on algae and detritus.

The trunk bears one or two pairs of lateral fins incorporating structures superficially similar to the fin rays of fish, with which they are not homologous. Unlike those of vertebrates, these lateral fins are composed of a thickened basement membrane extending from the epidermis. An additional caudal fin covers the post-anal tail. Two chaetognath species, Caecosagitta macrocephala and Eukrohnia fowleri, have bioluminescent organs on their fins.

Chaetognaths swim in short bursts using a dorso-ventral undulating body motion, where their tail fin assists with propulsion and the body fins with stabilization and steering. Some species are known to use the neurotoxin tetrodotoxin to subdue prey.

The body cavity is lined by peritoneum, and therefore represents a true coelom, and is divided into one compartment on each side of the trunk, and additional compartments inside the head and tail, all separated completely by septa.  Although they have a mouth with one or two rows of tiny teeth, compound eyes, and a nervous system, they have no circulatory, excretory or respiratory systems.

The mouth opens into a muscular pharynx, which contains glands to lubricate the passage of food. From here, a straight intestine runs the length of the trunk to an anus just forward of the tail. The intestine is the primary site of digestion and includes a pair of diverticula near the anterior end. Materials are moved about the body cavity by cilia. Waste materials are simply excreted through the skin and anus. Eukrohniid species possess an oil vacuole closely associated with the gut. This organ contains wax esters which may assist reproduction and growth outside of the production season for Eukrohnia hamata in Arctic seas. Owing to the position of the oil vacuole in the center of the tractus, the organ may also have implications for buoyancy, trim and locomotion.

The nervous system is reasonably simple, consisting of a ganglionated nerve ring surrounding the pharynx. The dorsal ganglion is the largest, but nerves extend from all the ganglia along the length of the body. Chaetognaths have two compound eyes, each consisting of a number of pigment-cup ocelli fused together. In addition, there are a number of sensory bristles arranged in rows along the side of the body, where they probably perform a function similar to that of the lateral line in fish. An additional, curved, band of sensory bristles lies over the head and neck.

The arrow worm rhabdomeres are derived from microtubules 20 nm long and 50 nm wide, which in turn form conical bodies that contain granules and thread structures. The cone body is derived from a cilium.

Reproduction
All species are hermaphroditic, carrying both eggs and sperm. Each animal possesses a pair of testes within the tail, and a pair of ovaries in the posterior region of the main body cavity. Immature sperm are released from the testes to mature inside the cavity of the tail, and then swim through a short duct to a seminal vesicle where they are packaged into a spermatophore.

During mating, each individual places a spermatophore onto the neck of its partner after rupture of the seminal vesicle. The sperm rapidly escape from the spermatophore and swim along the midline of the animal until they reach a pair of small pores just in front of the tail. These pores connect to the oviducts, into which the developed eggs have already passed from the ovaries, and it is here that fertilisation takes place.

The eggs are planktonic, develop in marsupial sacs or attached to algae, and hatch into miniature versions of the adult, without a well-defined larval stage.

Classification 
Chaetognaths are traditionally classed as deuterostomes by embryologists. Lynn Margulis and K. V. Schwartz place chaetognaths in the deuterostomes in their Five Kingdom classification. Molecular phylogenists, however, consider them to be protostomes. Thomas Cavalier-Smith places them in the protostomes in his Six Kingdom classification. The similarities between chaetognaths and nematodes mentioned above may support the protostome thesis—in fact, chaetognaths are sometimes regarded as a basal ecdysozoan or lophotrochozoan. Chaetognatha appears close to the base of the protostome tree in most studies of their molecular phylogeny. This may explain their deuterostome embryonic characters. If chaetognaths branched off from the protostomes before they evolved their distinctive protostome embryonic characters, they might have retained deuterostome characters inherited from early bilaterian ancestors. Thus chaetognaths may be a useful model for the ancestral bilaterian.
Studies of arrow worms' nervous systems suggests they should be placed within the protostomes. According to 2017 and 2019 papers, chaetognaths appear related to gnathiferans.

Fossil record 
Due to their soft bodies, chaetognaths fossilize poorly. Even so, several fossil chaetognath species have been described. Chaetognaths appear to have originated in the Cambrian Period. Complete body fossils have been formally described from the Lower Cambrian Maotianshan shales of Yunnan, China (Eognathacantha ercainella Chen & Huang and Protosagitta spinosa Hu) and the Middle Cambrian Burgess Shale of British Columbia (Oesia disjuncta Walcott), a view challenged by Conway Morris (2009). A more recent chaetognath, Paucijaculum samamithion Schram, has been described from the Mazon Creek biota from the Pennsylvanian of Illinois. Chaetognaths were thought possibly to be related to some of the animals grouped with the conodonts. The conodonts themselves, however, have been shown to be dental elements of vertebrates. It is now thought that protoconodont elements (e.g., Protohertzina anabarica Missarzhevsky, 1973), are probably grasping spines of chaetognaths rather than teeth of conodonts. Previously chaetognaths in the Early Cambrian were only suspected from these protoconodont elements, but the more recent discoveries of body fossils have confirmed their presence then.

Infection by giant viruses 

In 2018, reanalysis of electron microscopy photographs from the 1980s allowed scientists to identify a giant virus (Meelsvirus) infecting Adhesisagitta hispida; its site of multiplication is nuclear and the virions (length: 1.25 μm) are enveloped. In 2019, reanalysis of other previous studies has shown that structures that were taken in 1967 for bristles present on the surface of the species Spadella cephaloptera, and in 2003, for bacteria infecting Paraspadella gotoi, were in fact enveloped and spindle-shaped giant viruses with a cytoplasmic site of multiplication. The viral species infecting P. gotoi, whose maximum length is 3.1 μm, has been named Klothovirus casanovai (Klotho being the Greek name for one of the three Fates whose attribute was a spindle, and casanovai, in tribute to Pr J.-P. Casanova who devoted a large part of his scientific life to the study of chaetognaths). The other species has been named Megaklothovirus horridgei (in tribute to Adrian Horridge, the first author of the 1967 article). On a photograph, one of the viruses M. horridgei, although truncated, is 3.9 μm long, corresponding to about twice the length of the bacteria Escherichia coli. Many ribosomes are present in virions but their origin remains unknown (cellular, viral or only partly viral). To date, giant viruses known to infect metazoans are exceptionally rare.

Notes

References

External links 

 Image of Pseudosagitta gazellae with a krill in its gut from the Tasmanian Aquaculture and Fisheries Institute
 Chaetognatha of the World – last retrieved December 13, 2006
 Eric Fauré, Roxane-Marie Barthélémy: Specific mitochondrial ss-tRNAs in phylum Chaetognatha. In: Journal of Entomology and Zoology Studies 7(3), April 2019, pp. 304-315. hal-02130653

 
Planktology
Animal phyla
Extant Cambrian first appearances
Taxa named by Karl Grobben